The Lira–Gulu–Nebbi–Arua High Voltage Power Line is a high voltage electricity power line, under construction in Uganda. It connects the high voltage substation at Lira, in Lira District, to another high voltage substation at Arua, in Arua District, all in the Northern Region of the country.

Location

From Nebbi, the power line turns northwest and runs another , to end in the city of Arua.

Overview
This power line is intended to transmit electricity in an improved, sustainable manner to Uganda's Northern Region and extend the national electric grid to the West Nile sub-region. This is in line with government of Uganda's Vision 2040 to achieve middle income status by 2040.

Associated substations
The work includes the construction of 132kV substations at Gulu, Nebbi and Arua, and the expansion of the existing 132kV substation at Lira. If the Lira substation cannot be expanded for technical reasons, a brand new second 132kV substation will be built at Lira.

Construction
The government of Uganda obtained financing in the amount of US$100 million, from the International Development Association to fund the construction of this energy project. The government will contribute US$27.3 million to project costs. As of 5 May 2016, the feasibility studies, population resettlement plans and the acquisition of a procurement consultant had been completed. Work on soliciting of a contractor began in September 2016, with completion expected in 2022.

In July 2020, the construction contract was awarded to KEC International Limited of India and a joint venture company comprising  AVIC International Holding Corporation and Central Southern China Electric Power Design Institute Company Limited. Construction is expected to last two years and conclude in the second half of 2022.

See also
Energy in Uganda
List of power stations in Uganda

References

External links
Website of the Uganda Electricity Transmission Company Limited
Final Resettlement Action Plan For Lira-Gulu-Nebbi-Arua High Voltage Power Line (132kV). 21 March 2016

High-voltage transmission lines in Uganda
Energy infrastructure in Africa
Energy in Uganda
Proposed electric power transmission systems